The Loanda swift (Apus horus toulsoni) is a bird in the family Apodidae. Many taxonomists consider it to be a subspecies of the Horus swift. It is found in Angola and Republic of the Congo.

References
 BirdLife International 2013.  Species Factsheet:Apus toulsoni. Downloaded from http://www.birdlife.org  on 16 March 2013.

Apus (genus)
Birds described in 1877
Taxonomy articles created by Polbot